The Mount Rubidoux Manor is a 16-story residential tower located in downtown Riverside, California. Built in 1971, the tower is used as senior housing by American Baptist Homes of the West (ABHOW). First Baptist Church of Riverside, one of the oldest churches in the city, raised the money to build the tower.  The building is the tallest building in the City of Riverside.

References

External links
 Photo of Mount Rubidoux Manor

See also
 List of landmarks in Riverside, California

Buildings and structures in Riverside, California